William Herbert Carruth (April 5, 1859 – December 15, 1924) was an American educator and poet.  He taught at the University of Kansas and Stanford University.

Life
William Herbert Carruth was born in Osawatomie, Kansas on April 5, 1859.  He earned AB and MA degrees in modern languages from the University of Kansas (KU) and later two more advanced languages degrees, another MA and a PhD, from Harvard.  Carruth taught languages and literature at KU from 1880 until 1913, and was Professor of Comparative Literature at Stanford University from 1913 to 1924.  Carruth was president of the Pacific Coast Conference of the Unitarian Church.

Works
 Carruth translated Hermann Gunkel's "The Legends of Genesis" into an English version published in 1901.
 Carruth's poems include "Each in His Own Tongue," "Ghosts of Dreams," "Tescott" and "John Brown."

References

External links
 

American male poets
1859 births
1924 deaths
Harvard University alumni
People from Osawatomie, Kansas
University of Kansas alumni
University of Kansas faculty
Stanford University faculty